The Central District of Lenjan County is a district (bakhsh) in Lenjan County, Isfahan Province, Iran. At the 2006 census, its population was 179,602, in 46,389 families.  The district has five cities: Chamgardan, Zarrin Shahr, Sedeh Lenjan, Varnamkhast, and Zayandeh Rud. (The city of Fuladshahr is now in Fuladshahr District). The district has two rural districts (dehestan): Ashiyan Rural District and Khorram Rud Rural District.

References 

Lenjan County
Districts of Isfahan Province